These are lists of poisonings, deliberate and accidental, in chronological order by the date of death of the victim(s). They include mass poisonings, confirmed attempted poisonings, suicides, fictional poisonings and people who are known or suspected to have killed multiple people.

Non-fiction

Fatal
Socrates (d. 399 BC), Greek philosopher; according to Plato, he was sentenced to kill himself by drinking poison hemlock
Artaxerxes III (d. 338 BC), Persian king; possibly poisoned by his vizier Bagoas
Artaxerxes IV (d. 336 BC), Persian king; poisoned by his vizier Bagoas
Bagoas (d. 336 BC), Persian vizier and king-maker; poisoned by Darius III
Demosthenes (d. 322 BC), Athenian politician
Xu Pingjun (d. 71 BC), first empress of Emperor Xuan of Han.
Antipater the Idumaean (d. 43 BC), father of Herod the Great
Drusus Julius Caesar (d. 23), son of Tiberius
Emperor Claudius (d. 54), allegedly poisoned by his wife Agrippina with mushrooms or with the poisoned feather used to provoke vomiting
Emperor Zhi of Han (d.146)
Emperor Hui of Jin China (d. 304)
Ali ibn Abi Talib (d. 661), fourth caliph of the Rashidun Caliphate and first of the Twelve Imams of Shia Islam
Umar ibn Abd al-Aziz (d. 720), eighth caliph of the Umayyad Caliphate
Muhammad al-Baqir (d. 733), fifth Imam of Twelver Shia Islam; supposedly died after being given a poisoned saddle
Mūsá al-Kāẓim (d. 799), seventh Imam of Twelver Shia Islam
Beorhtric of Wessex (d. 802), unintentionally poisoned by his wife, Eadburh
Muhammad al-Jawad (d. 835), ninth Imam of Twelver Shia Islam; supposedly poisoned by his wife on orders from the new caliph
Romanus II (d. 963), Byzantine emperor of the Macedonian dynasty
Alan III, Duke of Brittany (d. 1040)
Constantine II of Armenia (d. 1129)
Alphonse I, Count of Toulouse (d. 1148)
Baldwin III of Jerusalem (d. 1162)
Blanche of Bourbon (d. 1361), first wife of King Pedro of Castile
Louis, Count of Gravina (d. 1362)
Robert, Count of Eu (d. 1387)
Ladislaus, King of Naples (d. 1414)
Dmitry Shemyaka (d. 1453), Grand Duke of Moscow; poisoned with arsenic by Vasily Tyomniy's agents in Great Novgorod
Giovanni Pico della Mirandola (d. 1494)
Margaret Drummond (d. 1502), mistress of King James IV of Scotland
Timoji (d. 1512), Hindu privateer and Portuguese ally
Juan Ponce de León (d. 1521), Spanish conquistador; died after being wounded by a poisoned arrow
Mikhail Skopin-Shuisky (d. 1610), Russian general and statesman
Yamada Nagamasa (d. 1630), Japanese adventurer
Charles VI, Holy Roman Emperor (d. 1740), ate poisonous mushrooms
Johann Schobert (d. 1767), German composer; ate poisonous mushrooms believing them to be edible
Bradford sweets poisoning (1858); 21 people died and more than 200 others became ill when confections accidentally made with arsenic trioxide were sold from a market stall in Bradford, England
Charles Francis Hall (d. 1871), American Arctic explorer poisoned with arsenic by members of the Polaris expedition.
Nine children killed on 28 May 1879 in Newark, Vermont after drinking from a polluted stream.
Guangxu Emperor (d. 1908), Emperor of the Qing dynasty; poisoned with arsenic by unidentified persons
Olive Thomas (d. 1920), American silent film actress; accidentally ingested a large dose of mercury(II) chloride
Madge Oberholtzer (d. 1925), rape victim of Ku Klux Klan leader D.C. Stephenson; died after attempting to commit suicide with mercury(II) chloride
Nine killed by apple cider contaminated by a pesticide at Elks National Home in Bedford, Virginia in November 1923.
Nestor Lakoba (d. 1936), Abkhaz Communist leader; poisoned by NKVD chief Lavrenti Beria
Abram Slutsky (d.1938), head of Soviet spy service; poisoned with hydrogen cyanide by NKVD
Nikolai Koltsov (d. 1940), Russian biologist; poisoned by NKVD secret police
Erwin Rommel (d. 1944), German general; opted to commit suicide with cyanide after facing trial for his involvement in the 20 July plot
Eva Hitler (née Braun) (d. 1945), wife of Adolf Hitler; committed suicide by cyanide capsule at Hitler's side
The six Goebbels children (d. 1945); poisoned by their parents Magda and Joseph Goebbels, who then killed themselves by poison and gunshots shortly afterwards
Heinrich Himmler (d. 1945), leader of the Nazi Schutzstaffel (SS); suicide by cyanide capsule after being captured
Odilo Globocnik (d. 1945)
Hermann Göring (d. 1946), leader of the Nazi Luftwaffe; suicide by cyanide capsule, long after being captured and only hours before his sentenced hanging was to take place
Theodore Romzha (d. 1947), bishop of the Ruthenian Greek Catholic Church; poisoned by NKVD agents, who injected him with curare on orders from Nikita Khrushchev
Alan Turing (d. 1954), British mathematician; apparently committed suicide by injecting an apple with cyanide and taking a bite, though it has also been speculated that the poisoning was accidental
Stepan Bandera (d. 1959); poisoned by a cyanide capsule shot from a gun by KGB agents
1971 Iraq poison grain disaster; at least 650 people died after eating methylmercury-treated grain intended for seeding
Bandō Mitsugorō VIII (d. 1975), Japanese kabuki actor; ate four livers of fugu fish
Nine killed in Denver City, Texas due to an accidental release of hydrogen sulfide.
Jayanta Hazarika (d. 1977), Assamese singer and musician
Georgi Markov (d. 1978), Bulgarian dissident; assassinated in London with ricin
Peoples Temple members (1978); over 900 died by cyanide-laced punch at Jonestown
Love Canal (up to 1978); buried toxic waste was covered and used as a building site for housing and a school in Niagara Falls, New York, resulting in claims of chronic poisoning that led to a massive environmental cleanup
Bhopal disaster (1984); accidental release of poisonous gas from a pesticide plant in India that killed over 10,000 people and injured many more
Matsumoto incident (1994); Sarin gas attack carried out by members of the Aum Shinrikyo group killed 7 people and injured approximately 200
Sarin gas attack on the Tokyo subway (1995); attack carried out by members of the Aum Shinrikyo group killed 12 and injured 1,034
Marshall Applewhite (d. 1997)
Moscow theater hostage crisis (2002); to end the crisis, the Federal Security Service (FSB) pumped an undisclosed chemical agent into the building's ventilation system, killing 40 militants and 133 hostages
Ibn al-Khattab (d. 2002), Sunni jihadi fighter; died from a poisoned letter sent by Russian FSB agency
Koodathayi Cyanide Murders (d. 2002–2016); 6 people were allegedly killed by Jolly Joseph using potassium cyanide
Roman Tsepov (d. 2004), Russian businessman; poisoned by unspecified radioactive material
2006 Ivory Coast toxic waste dump killed seventeen
Alexander Litvinenko (d. 2006), Russian ex-spy and investigator; died three weeks after being poisoned by radioactive polonium-210
Zamfara State lead poisoning epidemic (2010); at least 163 people died in Zamfara State, Nigeria
Murder of Garnett Spears (2014), a boy in New York whose mother suffered from Munchausen syndrome by proxy, eventually leading her to give her son a fatal amount of table salt
Slobodan Praljak (d. 2017), former Bosnian Croat retired general in the Croatian Army and the Croatian Defence Council; upon hearing of the guilty verdict upheld in his trial for war crimes, he drank poison in the courtroom and died a few hours later
Dawn Sturgess (d. 2018), accidentally poisoned with the same Novichok nerve agent used in the poisoning of Sergei and Yulia Skripal
Tribistovo poisoning (2021); carbon monoxide leak from a power generator killed eight teenagers in the New Year's Eve night

Non-fatal

Grigori Rasputin, Russian mystic; survived being poisoned with potassium cyanide, as well as being shot, bludgeoned, and being thrown into a frozen river before he finally died by drowning
Clare Boothe Luce, fell ill from arsenic poisoning in 1956 but did not die
Nikolay Khokhlov, poisoned by radioactive thallium in Germany in 1957 for refusing to work as a KGB assassin
Alexander Dubček, Slovak politician; survived an attempt to poison him with strontium-90 in 1968
Hafizullah Amin, second President of Afghanistan; survived a poisoning by a Soviet agent in 1979
Zhu Ling, Chinese university student poisoned with thallium in 1995
Khaled Mashal, leader of Palestinian fundamentalist organization Hamas; survived being poisoned by Israeli assassins in 1997 after two of the assassins were captured and an antidote was supplied by Israel in exchange for their release
Anna Politkovskaya, Russian journalist; poisoned during a flight to Beslan in 2004
Viktor Yushchenko, Ukrainian politician; poisoned with dioxin during the 2004 Ukrainian electoral campaign
Viktor Kalashnikov, Russian ex-KGB colonel; both he and his wife survived being poisoned with mercury in 2010
Vladimir Kara-Murza, Russian opposition politician; poisoned in 2017 (also possibly in 2015) with an unknown toxin
Sergei and Yulia Skripal, Russian former double-agent and his daughter; poisoned in 2018 in Salisbury, England with Novichok nerve agent
Alexei Navalny, Russian opposition leader, poisoned in 2020 with Novichok, during a flight from Tomsk to Moscow
  Unnamed Taylor Child deliberate destruction of a child's liver caused by her mother, Shauna Taylor, in an act of Munchausen by proxy and intentional iron poisoning.

Alleged

Alexander the Great (d. 323 BC)
Mithridates VI of Pontus (d. 63 BC), king of Pontus and Armenia Minor
Ptolemy XIV of Egypt (d. 44 BC); if so, by his sister Cleopatra
Augustus (d. 14), Roman Emperor, with poisoned figs by his wife Livia
Germanicus (d. 19), Roman general
Claudius (d. 54), Roman Emperor, by his wife Agrippina the Younger
Boudica (d. 60 or 61), Queen of the Iceni tribe and leader of the rebellion against Roman rule in Britain; committed suicide by poison according to Tacitus, though Dio Cassius claimed natural illness
Constance of Normandy (d. 1090), daughter of King William I of England
King John of England (d. 1216); with peaches
Pope Benedict XI (d. 1304)
Stefan Dusan (d. 1355), Serbian king
Anne Neville (d. 1485), Queen Consort of England, died of tuberculosis but said to have been poisoned by her husband Richard III
Matthias Corvinus (d. 1490), King of Hungary
Catherine of Aragon (d. 1536), Queen Consort of England, thought to have been poisoned by her former husband Henry VIII of England or his wife Anne Boleyn
Barbara Radziwiłł (d. 1551), Queen of Poland
King Eric XIV of Sweden (d. 1577); according to folklore, he was killed from poisoning by arsenic hidden in pea soup
Tycho Brahe (d. 1601), Danish astronomer
Jamestown colonists (1607–1610); standard historical accounts suggest many early colonists died of starvation, but the possibility of arsenic poisoning by rat poison (or of death by bubonic plague) has also been reported
Robert Cecil, 1st Earl of Salisbury (d. 1612)
Victor Amadeus I, Duke of Savoy (d. 1637)
Wolfgang Amadeus Mozart (d. 1791), Austrian composer; with antimony
Napoleon Bonaparte (d. 1821); some claim he was killed with arsenic by someone on his staff, though the evidence is inconclusive
Pope Pius VIII (d. 1830)
Zachary Taylor (d. 1850), 12th President of the United States; theorized by author Clara Rising that his milk was poisoned during an Independence Day celebration
John Gallagher Montgomery (d. 1857), U.S. Congressman from Pennsylvania
Charles Darwin (d. 1882), English naturalist; possibly died due to self-medication with Fowler's solution, one-percent potassium arsenite
Hanoi Poison Plot (1908), a group of local Vietnamese tried to poison the entire French colonial army's garrison in the Citadel of Hanoi
Huo Yuanjia (d. 1910), wushu master and Chinese national hero; arsenic
Emperor Gojong of Korea (d. 1919); allegedly poisoned by the Japanese
Maxim Gorky (d. 1936), Russian writer; NKVD chief Genrikh Yagoda admitted at the Trial of the Twenty One that he ordered to poison Gorky and his son
Robert Johnson (d. 1938), American musician
Raoul Wallenberg (d. c. 1947), Swedish humanitarian who saved tens of thousands of Jews during World War II; reportedly poisoned in Lubyanka prison by Grigory Mairanovsky
Joseph Stalin (d. 1953); officially cerebral hemorrhage, but according to Vyacheslav Molotov's memoirs and historians Radzinsky and Antonov-Ovseenko, Stalin was poisoned on Lavrenty Beria's orders
Vasili Blokhin (d. 1955), former executioner of NKVD
Lal Bahadur Shastri (d. 1966), second Prime Minister of India
João Goulart (d. 1976), former Brazilian president ousted by 1964 coup d'état
Carlos Lacerda (d. 1977), Brazilian journalist and presidential nominee
Pope John Paul I (d. 1978)
Gulf War syndrome, a chronic multi-symptom disorder afflicting more than 250,000 returning veterans and civilian workers of the Gulf War of 1990–1991; while the etiology of the condition continues to be debated, various manmade poisons have been suggested as possible causes
Yuri Shchekochikhin (d. 2003), Russian investigative journalist; died presumably from poisoning by radioactive thallium
Yasser Arafat (d. 2004); reputedly died from liver cirrhosis, which may be a consequence of chronic alcohol use or poisoning. Some Arafat supporters feel it is unlikely that Arafat habitually used alcohol (forbidden by Islam), and so suspect poisoning. However, it is also important to note that cirrhosis is not necessarily caused by alcohol use, or indeed any poison at all.
Ardeshir Hosseinpour (d. 2007), Iranian nuclear scientist; possibly assassinated by Mossad with "radioactive poisoning" or "gas poisoning"

Poisoners

Locusta, professional poisoner hired by Roman emperor Nero and his mother Agrippina the Younger for several murders
Lucrezia Borgia (d. 1519), alleged by rivals of the Borgia family to be a poisoner, using a hollow ring to poison drinks with white arsenic
Edward Squire (d. 1598), English scrivener and sailor executed for conspiring to poison Queen Elizabeth I and Robert Devereux, 2nd Earl of Essex
George Chapman, hanged after murdering three common-law wives
Mary Ann Cotton, 19th-century woman who poisoned family members for financial gain
Maria Swanenburg, Dutch serial killer who murdered at least 27 and was suspected of killing more than 90 people
Thomas Neill Cream (d. 1892), British serial killer
Vera Renczi, Romanian serial killer who used arsenic to kill two husbands, a son, and 32 suitors
Nannie Doss, black widow
Anna Marie Hahn (d. 1938), American serial killer
Dr. John Bodkin Adams, British doctor acquitted in 1957 but suspected of killing 163 patients via morphia and barbiturates.
Anjette Lyles, American restauranteur responsible for the poisoning deaths of four relatives between 1952–1958 in Macon, Georgia, apprehended on May 6, 1958 and sentenced to death yet later was involuntary commitmented due her to diagnosis of paranoid schizophrenic, died aged 52 on December 4, 1977 at the Central State Hospital, Milledgeville in Georgia. 
Genene Jones, homicidal nurse
Grigory Mairanovsky, received Soviet PhD degree for testing poisons on political prisoners
Stella Nickell, used cyanide-laced Excedrin to kill her husband and another woman in suburban Seattle in 1986
Charles Sobhraj, serial killer who preyed on Western tourists throughout Southeast Asia during the 1970s
Jim Jones, cult leader responsible for the mass murder–suicide of 918 of his followers in 1978, using cyanide-laced Flavor-Aid at Jonestown, Guyana 
Michael Swango, American physician and surgeon who fatally poisoned at least thirty of his patients and colleagues
Graham Frederick Young (d. 1990), British serial killer
Members of the Aum Shinrikyo religious group in Japan in the 1990s often used poisons for murder, including chemical weapons such as VX and Sarin
Daisuke Mori, Japanese nurse convicted of one murder and four attempted murders by muscle relaxant
Harold Shipman (d. 2004), English general practitioner and one of the most prolific known serial killers in modern history
Richard Kuklinski (d. 2006), American contract killer who was associated with the Gambino crime family

Fiction

As poisoning is a long-established plot device in crime fiction, this is not intended to be an exhaustive list.

Novels

Crime

 Anthony Berkeley: The Poisoned Chocolates Case
 Ann Granger: Say It With Poison
 Francis Iles: Before the Fact (filmed as Suspicion), Malice Aforethought
 Agatha Christie: Three Act Tragedy, Sad Cypress, A Pocket Full of Rye, Crooked House, And Then There Were None
 John Dickson Carr: The Burning Court, The Black Spectacles (U.S. title: The Problem of the Green Capsule)
 Raymond Postgate: Verdict of Twelve
 Freeman Wills Crofts: The 12.30 from Croydon
 Sir Arthur Conan Doyle: A Study in Scarlet, The Adventure of the Devil's Foot
 Dashiell Hammett: Fly Paper
 Dorothy Sayers: The Unpleasantness at the Bellona Club, Strong Poison
 Gosho Aoyama: Case Closed/Detective Conan
 Rex Stout: Fer-de-Lance, The Red Box, Black Orchids
 Cornell Woolrich: Waltz into Darkness (filmed as Mississippi Mermaid and Original Sin)
 Isaac Asimov: The Death Dealers, The Naked Sun, David Starr, Space Ranger

Other

V.C. Andrews: Flowers in the Attic
Alexandre Dumas, père: The Count of Monte Cristo and The Three Musketeers
Gustave Flaubert: Madame Bovary
Kaori Yuki: Count Cain (GodChild after vol. 5) Protagonist Cain Hargreaves is known as the Count/Earl of Poisons. He has quite a collection of poisons, and frequently solves murder cases, almost all of which involve poisons.
Snow White ate a poisoned apple
Mingo Swieter in Ricarda Huch's 1917 novel, The Deruga Case (curare)
Baron Vladimir Harkonnen in Dune by Frank Herbert
Unsuccessful poisoning of Ron Weasley in Harry Potter and the Half-Blood Prince. The intended victim was Albus Dumbledore.
David Eddings sagas:  In the Belgariad, the Nyissan people poison each other on a regular basis; some work as professional poisoners.
Isaac Asimov: "Obituary", "Sucker Bait", "The Winnowing"

Films

Poisoning Paradise 10
Arsenic and Old Lace (1944)
D.O.A. (1950)
The Young Poisoner's Handbook (1995)
Crank (2006)
Jill Tracy's The Fine Art of Poisoning

Television

Third and Tenth Doctors in Doctor Who regenerated due to radiation poisoning. The Fifth Doctor regenerated due to poisoning from the substance Spectrox, giving the antidote to his also poisoned companion Peri Brown.
King Joffrey, Olenna Tyrell, Gregor Clegane, and Jon Arryn in Game of Thrones
Peter III of Russia in The Great

Plays

Joseph Kesselring: Arsenic and Old Lace
William Shakespeare:
Romeo commits suicide by poison in Romeo and Juliet
Hamlet, King Claudius, Gertrude and Laertes in Hamlet, Prince of Denmark
Imogen in Cymbeline

See also

List of people by cause of death and List of unusual deaths
Mass suicide
Lethal injection
Food poisoning
Food taster

Arsenic poisoning
Cyanide poisoning
Lead poisoning
Mercury poisoning
Pesticide poisoning
Poisonous animals
Poisonous plants
Thallium poisoning
Venom

References

10.Journey to the seemingly idyllic world of Native Hawaiians. Synopsis https://www.imdb.com/title/tt8084776/plotsummary#synopsis

Poison